Gianna Borrego Martínez (born 7 October 2000) is a Cuban footballer who plays as a right back for the Cuba women's national team.

International career
Borrego represented Cuba at the 2020 CONCACAF Women's U-20 Championship. She capped at senior level during the 2022 CONCACAF W Championship qualification.

References

External links

2000 births
Living people
People from Nueva Gerona
Cuban women's footballers
Women's association football fullbacks
Cuba women's international footballers